The American cooking-themed television series The Pioneer Woman has aired on Food Network since its inception in 2011. As of April 2021, over 230 episodes have aired through the shows twenty-seven seasons.

Episodes

Season 1 (2011)

Season 2 (2012)

Season 3 (2012–2013)

Specials

Season 4 (2013)

Season 5 (2013)

Season 6 (2013–2014)

Season 7 (2014)

Season 8 (2014)

Season 9 (2014–2015)

Season 10 (2015)

Season 11 (2015)

Season 12 (2015–2016)

Season 13 (2016)

Season 14 (2016)

Season 15 (2016–)

Notes

References

External links
 
 

Lists of American non-fiction television series episodes
Lists of food television series episodes